Bauang, officially the Municipality of Bauang, is a 1st class municipality in the province of La Union, Philippines. According to the 2020 census, it has a population of 78,449 people.  In Philippine Literature and History, it is known for being the homeplace of literary icon and World War II martyr Manuel Arguilla.

The MacArthur Highway runs through the town which junctions with Naguilian Road, one of the mountain roads leading to Baguio.

Etymology
Bauang originated from either two Ilocano language words: baoang (meaning "garlic") or buang also means "river split into two" flowing into the sea (in reference to the delta that divides an eponymous river into two).

History
Bauang was a pre-colonial settlement in the country that became one of the first missions organized by the Augustinians in Northern Luzon. It used to belong to the federation of towns and settlements jointly known as “Baratao, Buratao and Balitao”. In 1587, Bauang became the center of the “ministerio” of Baratao and was first placed under the patronage of Sts. Peter and Paul. Fr. Miguel Sano, an Augustinian missionary, was the first priest of the Parish of the Chair of St. Peter which was later on reverted to its historical titular Saints Peter and Paul.

Like other towns in the province, Bauang also had its share in the devastating invasions of Moro pirates ("tirong") made series of invasions in Bauang. These invasions gave rise to the construction of watchtowers or baluarte, by then Gobernadorcillo Don Juan Mallare. In 1890, Bauang revolucionarios led by Remigio Patacsil and Mauro Ortiz ousted the Spanish colonizers (cazadores or Spanish soldiers).

In 1913, however, Bauang barrios were given to San Fernando: Pagudpud, Pagdalagan, Sevilla, Bungro, Tanquigan, and Sibuan-Otong. During the Pacific War, heroes of Bauang fought in its beaches, in Lingayen Gulf, Bataan and Corregidor (as USAFIP-NL). The Japanese executed Manuel Arguilla, poet and journalist, Major Alberto O. Fenit (USAFFE), and Bauang Mayor Ambrosio Rimando. A town plaza monument today honors these Bauang heroes.

On March 14, 1945, the Allied Forces, along with guerillas and local inhabitants successfully captured the Bauang Bridges from the Japanese forces. The bridge was heavily guarded by the Japanese Army as it is the feasible route to Baguio, where the Japanese themselves virtually inaccessible from any ground attack. The capture of the two bridges is one of the most brilliant small unit actions of World War II.

Bauang is known as the Beach Capital of the Philippines (1970, the shorelines of Baccuit Sur to Pagdalagan Sur). Bauang has a treasure: Research Reef (a dive spot for local and foreign scuba divers).

Geography
Bauang is also lying west of Baguio via Naguilian Road.

Climate

Barangays
Bauang is politically subdivided into 39 barangays. These barangays are headed by elected officials: Barangay Captain, Barangay Council, whose members are called Barangay Councilors. All are elected every three years.

Demographics

Economy

Tourism

Festivals and local events

The natives, who are predominantly Roman Catholic, speak Iloko, Filipino, and English. The primary industries are farming, fishing, power plant, and quarrying.

Bauang's main products are rice, corn, guapples and native grapes (barangays Payocpoc, Santiago, Bagbag, and Urayong), mango, lowland vegetables, livestock, tobacco, marine products, saltwater fish politically.

Guapple by-products are also sold in Bauang: bread, buchi, chunky, cocktail, cookies, cupcake, dried, empanada, espasol, flan, guinataan, gulaman, inipit, jam, jelly, juice, kutsinta, pastilles, maja, marmalade, oatmeal, pie, yema, polvoron, preserved, rolls, siopao, tarts, turrones, macaroons, bars, and fingers as pasalubongs.

Beaches and sunsets of Bauang

Bauang is known for its fine-sand beaches, including Taberna, Baccuit Sur and Norte, Paringao, and Pagdalagan Sur beaches.

Bauang's beaches are accessible from several resorts: Bali Hai Beach Resort (Paringao), Long Beach Resort, Coconut Grove Beach Resort and San Luis del Mar (Baccuit Norte), inter alia.

Manuel Arguilla commemorations 

Among Philippines literary circles, Bauang has become a pilgrimage site of sorts for celebrating the life of and works of writer and World War II martyr Manuel Arguilla, with writers visiting the author's hometown to experience the landscapes that inspired him, and which featured prominently in his stories.

The most prominent event celebrating Arguilla was the 2017 run of the Taboan Literary Festival, a celebration of Philippine literature which changes venues every year, organized by the National Commission on Culture and the Arts during every National Arts Month in February. Among the prominent artists who came to the festival to celebrate Arguilla were writer-academic Butch Dalisay and National Artist of the Philippines Bienvenido Lumbera.

The ancestral house where Arguilla grew up is still standing at Barangay Nagrebcan in Bauang, bearing a historical marker put in place by the National Historical Commission of the Philippines.

Saints Peter and Paul Parish Church

The Sts. Peter & Paul Parish Church (canonically erected on April 25, 1587, by the Augustinian missionaries) celebrates its fiesta every June 29. It is under the jurisdiction of the Roman Catholic Diocese of San Fernando de La Union (Dioecesis Ferdinandopolitana ab Unione, Suffragan of Lingayen – Dagupan, which was created on January 19, 1970, and erected on April 11, 1970, comprising the Civil Province of La Union, under the Titular, St. William the Hermit, February 10). It has been headed by the Most Rev. Rodolfo F. Beltran, D.D., bishop since January 18, 2013. The Church is under a diocese of the Latin Church of the Roman Catholic Church in the Philippines from the Archdiocese of Nueva Segovia. The Church is also under the pastorship of Rev. Fr. Perpetuo Concepcion. Its Parochial Fiesta is on April 26.

The Saints Peter and Paul Church is one of the oldest churches in the Philippines. Damaged by the 1892 earthquake, the Church was restored in 1895. Damaged again in 1944, the stone convent was destroyed in 1955. The Sacred Heart School now stands from the old Convent.

The Church has a rectangular four-storey bell tower (with two bells, restored with cement and hollow blocks in 1973). The Church interior was painted in 1978. The July 16, 1990, quake destroyed the facade which was later rebuilt. In 1901 US Army's (then) Lt. Col. Thomas Barry, who was chasing Emilio Aguinaldo during the Philippine–American War, took the bell as a "token souvenir" and later gave the bell to his alma mater, the United States Military Academy at West Point, New York, where it was housed for over a century. The bell was ceremoniously returned to the Philippines in May 2016 to be reinstalled in the Peter and Paul Church.

The Grotto of Our Lady of Lourdes is at the foot of the Church.

400-year old San Pedro Bell

On May 23, 2016, the 400-year old "San Pedro" bell made from alloy of gold, silver, and copper has been returned to the Saints Peter and Paul Parish Church, after American soldiers during the Philippine–American War in 1901 took it from the church to West Point Academy in New York.

Government 
Just as the national government, the Bauang's municipal government is divided into three branches: executive, legislative, and judiciary. The judicial branch is administered solely by the Supreme Court of the Philippines. The LGUs have control of the executive and legislative branches.

The executive branch is composed of the mayor and the barangay captain for the barangays. The legislative branch is composed of the Sangguniang Bayan (town assembly), Sangguniang Barangay (barangay council), and the Sangguniang Kabataan for the youth sector.

The seat of Government is vested upon the Mayor Menchie L. de Guzman who holds office since June 30, 2019, at the Bauang Town Hall. The Sangguniang Bayan is the center of legislation.

Elected officials

Infrastructure
1590 Energy Corporation
The Bauang Diesel Power Plant formerly owned by the Bauang Private Power Corporation (BPPC) is a diesel-fired power plant that commenced operations in July 1995 with a 215 MW-capacity. State-owned National Power Corporation and the First Private Power Corp. (FPPC) entered into a Build-Operate-Transfer Agreement for the BPCC for a period of 15 years.

On July 26, 2010, after the BOT expiration, it was turned over to the NAPOCOR and the Power Sector Assets and Liabilities Management Corp. (PSALM) and later to the Provincial Government of La Union. Both Viviant Energy Corporation and Gigawatt Power, Inc. under the 1590 Energy Corp. operates the Bauang power facility provide the additional supply to the Luzon grid.

Major facilities inside the plant include a substation, two 100,000 bbl steel fuel storage tanks, sludge treatment plant, and five auxiliary buildings consisting of an administration building (812 sq.m), maintenance building (981 sq.m), warehouse building (591 sq.m), guest house (583 sq.m), bunkhouse (660 sq.m), and a canteen (550 sq.m).

The world's largest medium-speed power station in Bauang maintains an IMS certification for ISO 9901:2000, ISO 14001:2004, and OHSAS 18001 from Certification International.

PLDT Asia-Pacific Cable Network (APCN) in Baccuit Sur
A Digital Optical Cable System for telecommunications services linking Hong Kong, Indonesia, Japan, Korea, Malaysia, Taiwan, Thailand, Singapore, and the Philippines is strategically located at the coastline barangay of Baccuit Norte in Bauang, La Union.

The facility, owned by the Philippine Long Distance Telecommunications Company, aims to benefit the users of telecommunications services and consequently stimulate the rapid expansion of business and government intercourse between the Philippines and the foreign countries to be served.

Education
Elementary schools:

 Acao Elementary School - Barangay Acao
 Baccuit Elementary School - Barangay Baccuit Sur
 Bagbag Elementary School - Barangay Bagbag
 Ballay Elementary School - Barangay Ballay
 Baratao Elementary School - Sitio Baratao, Barangay Acao
 Bauang North Central School - Barangay Central East
 Bawanta Elementary School - Barangay Bawanta
 Bigbiga Elementary School - Sitio Bigbiga, Barangay Lower San Agustin
 Boy-Utan Elementary School - Barangay Boy-Utan
 Bucayab Elementary School - Barangay Bucayab
 Cabalayangan Elementary School - Barangay Cabalayangan
 Calumbaya Elementary School - Barangay Calumbaya
 Casilagan Integrated School - Barangay Casilagan
 Guerrero Elementary School - Barangay Guerrero
 Palugsi-Limmansangan Elementary School - Barangay Palugsi-Limmansangan
 Parian Este Elementary School - Barangay Parian Este
 Parian Oeste Elementary School - Barangay Parian Oeste
 Paringao Elementary School - Barangay Paringao
 Payocpoc Elementary School - Barangay Payocpoc Sur
 Pudoc Primary School - Barangay Pudoc
 Pugo Elementary School - Barangay Pugo
 Quinavite Elementary School - Barangay Quinavite
 Saint Anthony Montessori Educational Network, Inc. (Private) - Barangay Central East
 Saints Peter and Paul Learning Center (Private) - Barangay Central East, beside the Church
 San Agustin Elementary School- Barangay Upper San Agustin
 Santiago Elementary School - Barangay Santiago
 Santa Monica Elementary School - Barangay Santa Monica

Secondary schools:

 Baccuit National High School - Barangay Baccuit Sur
 Ballay National High School - Barangay Ballay
 Bawanta National High School - Barangay Bawanta
 Casilagan Integrated School - Barangay Casilagan
 Don Eulogio de Guzman Memorial National High School - Barangay Calumbaya
 Eulogio Clarence de Guzman Junior Memorial National Vocational HS (formerly Acao National High School) - Barangay Acao
 Paringao National High School - Barangay Paringao
 Sacred Heart School (Private) - Barangay Central East
 Saint Anthony Montessori Educational Network, Inc. (Private) - Barangay Central East

Tertiary:
 La Union Colleges of Science and Technology (Private) - Barangay Central West
 Saint Louis College Development Center (Private)

Bauang in Literature 
Bauang, specifically Barangay Nagrebcan on the shores of the Balili River, features prominently in the works of Philippine literary icons Manuel Arguilla and F.Sionil Jose.

Notable personalities 
 Manuel Arguilla, one of the Philippines' most influential English writers, grew up in Bauang's Barrio Nagrebcan

Gallery

References

Sources

External links

 
 Bauang Local Government Site
 [ Philippine Standard Geographic Code]
 Philippine Census Information
 Local Governance Performance Management System

Municipalities of La Union
Populated places established in 1590